Hlib Vysheslavskyi (born on 6 May 1962 in Kyiv, Ukraine, USSR)  — is a Ukrainian artist; art historian, he holds a PhD in art theory and history (2014), and is a member of the International Union of Artists «Sztuka bez Granic» (Kraków) and the National Union of Artists of Ukraine. He is an author of art in painting, graphics, photo, video, installation and scientific research of contemporary art. Representative of Ukrainian New Wave.

Glib's art works are presented at the Menton Pales Carnoles Museum (France), National Art Museum of Ukraine, Sumy Art Museum (Ukraine), in the Sarajevo Museum of Contemporary Art (Croatia) etc.

Biography and creation 

Hlib Vysheslavskyi was born in Kyiv on 6 May 1962. 
In 1980, Hlib graduated from the Shevchenko State Art School, Kyiv, Ukraine. 

Then he continued studies in «Ecole nationale supérieure des beaux-arts», (Paris) (1989–1993). He was trained in the fund «Villa Arson» (Nice) in 1992. He graduated his training in Kyiv in the National Academy of Visual Arts and Architecture (1993–1997).

During Perestroika Hlib was a member of the Squatting movement, Soviet Nonconformist Art. Later he investigated underground movement and published theoretical articles. He worked as part of the New Wave group in the art of Ukraine “Sednev-88”, where A. Babak, M. Geiko, R. Zhuk, P. Kerestey, P. Makov, A. Roitburd, A. Sukholit and others also performed.

In Kyiv he founded the magazine «Terra incognita». It is a private, an independent and non-profit publication about the theory and practice of contemporary visual art (1993–2001). As a video artist he was a member of the 50th Venice Biennale. He took part in the international Biruchiy contemporary art project (2005). A trend accentuated on digital technology in the art he realized in the «G. V. Kh.»- group: Olena Holub, Vysheslavskyi, Kharchenko). Their project «Digital yard № 3» was shown in Amsterdam, the Netherlands (2008).

Vysheslavskyi was Biennale curator «Month of Photography in Kyiv» (2003), co-curator of the exhibition «10 years the Ukrainian Modern Art Research Institute». He also was the chief editor of the «Gallery» magazine (2007–2010). He is the author of monographs and articles publications in specialized magazines, in particular, «Une culture dissimulée» in «La regle du jeu», 2015, No. 57. He is the co-author of the theoretical book «Terminology of Modern Art», where he analyzes the contemporary art diversity and development, based on the examples of more than 400 authors.

Since the second half of the 1990s Hlib Vysheslavkyi has been participating in exhibitions in France. He held exhibitions at the Alexandre Gallery (Paris, 1989), the Michel Cabaret Gallery (Nice, 2002), and the Pales Carnoles Museum of Art (Menton, 2002), in the cathedral – St. Germain des Pres (Paris, 1993) and Paris Nord (Paris, 1993), at D.Art – Nice Expo (Nice, 1996), Salin des peintres mediteranee (Nice, 2003), at the Museum of Art, Toulouse, France (1993). His photos taken over the past few years have been exhibited at the Salon des arts modernes  —  St.-Sulpice (Paris, 2019), and at the exhibition «Station Paris» in Cloitre, gallery «Caravane», (Paris, 2019).

He currently works at the Ukrainian Modern Art Research Institute as a research (from 2003). He combines scientific work with artistic one, as artist participates in art exhibitions of contemporary art. The following signatures are found on his works: Glib Viches, Hlib Vysheslavskyi and in Ukrainian.

Selected works

 in Ukr.:  Hlib Vysheslavskyi, Sidor Hibelynda-O. '. // Terminology of Modern Art, Paris-Kyiv, Terra Incognita, 2010, – P.235-242.  
 in Fr.: Glib Viches . Une culture dissimulée//La Rеgle du Jeu. Paris, 2015. № 57. P. 131–139. 
 in Ger.:  Glib Vysheslavskyj. Vom nonkonformismus zur Oragen Revolution // Springerin, Viennа, 2006. P. 22–32

Sources 
 in Fr.:Perottino S.  Glib Vysheslavskyi on le Pensee du sensible.// Meditrrancee. – 1992. – №10.
 in De.: Sergey Kuskov.  Triade. lunge Kunst ans Frankreich, Rusland und Deutscland. Ausstellungs-katalog. Leipzig, 1992.
 in Pl.: Sacharuk V.  Robit swoje nigzego nie oczekujac. / / Magazyn Sztuki. – 1994. – № 4. – 160–167 p.
  Perrotino C. Art Impressions. / / Directory. – Kyiv – 1994. – 20–22 seconds.
 in fr., rus.: Burlaka B. Du cote de l'art. // Glib Vyche-Slavskyi. Musee des beaux-arts. Exhibition catalog. Menton, France, 2002 – 1c.
 in fr.: Laffont N.  Entre peinture et photo. // Nice-Matin, 27 octobre 2002 – 16p.
 in rus.: Minko E. " The two sides of the world . // Domus designe, April 2003 – 33s.

References

 
 External links 
  in Ukr.: Hlib Vysheslavskyi. Ukrainian art library
  in Ukr.: Interview with Hlib Vysheslavskyi. # 1944 
 in Ukr.: Peter Yakovenko. GVKh Group // Day, 2008, - October 8. 
 Peter Yakovenko''. Artistic chaos.//Den, 2012, — January 31.
 in Ukr.: Glib Viches.Contemporary art of Ukraine - from underground to mainstream. Kyiv, MARI of Ukraine.2020

Ukrainian art critics
Ukrainian artists
Shevchenko State Art School alumni
French artists
Living people
1962 births
French art critics